2 Vulpeculae is a binary star system in the northern constellation of Vulpecula, located around 1,800 light years away from the Sun. It is visible to the naked eye as a faint, blue-white hued star with an apparent visual magnitude of 5.43.

2 Vulpeculae is a double-lined spectroscopic binary; as of 2002, the pair had an angular separation of  along a position angle of 127.2°.

The primary component of the binary is a rapidly rotating Be star with a stellar classification of B1 IV. It is a variable star with an amplitude of 0.06 magnitude and a period of 0.6096 days, tentatively classified as Beta Cephei variable.  The variability was discovered in 1959, and it has been assigned the variable star designation ES Vulpeculae.

References

External links
 

B-type subgiants
Be stars
Pulsating variables
Spectroscopic binaries
Vulpecula
Durchmusterung objects
Vulpeculae, 02
180968
094827
7318
Vulpeculae, ES